The 92nd Ivan Sirko Separate Mechanized Brigade, abbreviated 92 OMBr, is a formation of the Ukrainian Ground Forces. Its honorific name is after Cossack military leader Ivan Sirko. The unit was formed in 1999 as the 6th Mechanized Division based on the 6th Division of the National Guard of Ukraine. In 2000 it was reorganized as the 92nd Mechanized Brigade. Following the Russo-Ukrainian war and the 2015 decommunization in Ukraine, the brigade's Soviet honors and heritage were purged.

48th Rifle Division (1920–1992)

Names
2nd Tula Rifle Division48th Rifle Division118th Motor Rifle Division48th Motor Rifle Division

Early history
The division traces its heritage to the Soviet 48th Rifle Division that was established on 26 February 1920 by renaming the 2nd Tula Rifle Division. It became a territorial division after the Soviet-Polish War and was then upgraded to 'cadre' status. On 2 December 1930 it was given the title 'in the name of M.I. Kalinin.' In August–September 1939, two of its rifle regiments were expanded to become the 123rd Rifle Division and the 138th Rifle Division. In 1940 the division participated in the occupation of the Baltic states. On June 22, 1941, it was assigned to the 10th Rifle Corps of the 8th Army. It was based at Raseiniai in Lithuania, part of the second echelon, but soon after Operation Barbarossa began it was severely battered by the 6th Panzer Division. In September 1941 it incorporated the remnants of the 118th Rifle Division. In October it became part of the Coastal Operations Group of the Leningrad Front, defending the Oranienbaum Bridgehead pocket, just west of Leningrad on the coast of the Gulf of Finland. Then fought as part of the 2nd Shock Army and 42nd Army. On 19 January 1944 it was given the title 'Ropshinskaya.'

After the war, the division became the 69th Mechanized Division. In 1957 the 69th became the 118th Motor Rifle Division at Bolhrad. In 1964 it became the 48th Motor Rifle Ropshinska Order of the October Revolution and Order of the Red Banner awards division named after Mikhail Kalinin. From October 1968, it was based at Vysoké Mýto with the Central Group of Forces. It remain in Czechoslovakia until 1990 when it was the first Division to depart (between February and May 1990). It appears that there wasn't enough space for the entire Division, so the 210th Motor Rifle Regiment was attached to the 18th Guards Motor Rifle Division. The remainder of the division departed for Ukraine, with the last units arriving by May 1991.

Relocation
1996 Jane's Intelligence Review information indicated the division had been moved to Smolensk in the Moscow Military District where it was later disbanded. Later information indicates that it was actually withdrawn to Kluhino-Bashkyrivka (Kluhyno-Bashkyrivka), Kharkiv Oblast (Chuhuiv) in Ukraine using the same garrison as the disbanded 75th Guards Tank Division. By then, it had been decided that in order to avoid the restrictions of the Conventional Forces in Europe Treaty, certain elements of the Soviet Army would be transferred to other non-MOD armed forces. Whole units were transferred to the KGB. When the last of the 48th arrived in Chuhuiv, the entire Division was transferred to the Directorate of Instruction for Special Purposes KGB by June 1991. Regiments included the 265th Guards., 1335th MRR, 353rd Separate Training Battalion, 31st Separate Reconnaissance Battalion, 813th Separate Communications Battalion, 88th Separate Repair and Refurbishment Battalion, 409th Separate Material Supply Battalion, 34th Separate Medical Battalion, 99th Separate Engineering-Sapper Company, 348th Separate Chemical Defense Company. To replace the loss of the 210th MRR, the 255th Guards MRR was formed for the division, probably from what was left of the 75th GTD.

National Guard service
Most formations of the division were dissolved in 1999, except for the reconnaissance company based in Chuhuiv.

92 Mechanized Brigade
In 1999 there was established 92 Mechanized Brigade based on the 6th Division (NGU). Even though most of units of the original Soviet division were relocated to Russia following dissolution of the Soviet Union, the new brigade was given all the honors of the Soviet 48th Rifle Division including its honorary name with Ukrainian adaptation, Ropshynska.

Missions to Iraq
During October 2003, the 61st Separate Mechanized Battalion was formed. The Battalion was in Iraq from February to September 2004 as a unit of the 6th Mechanized Brigade (Ukraine). 104 soldiers from the brigade have taken part in UN peacekeeping missions to Lebanon, Liberia, Sierra Leone and Former Yugoslavia. Between 2007 and 2011, the brigade was commanded by Colonel Serhiy Guschenko. In 2011, Colonel Volodymyr Kozak became the brigade commander.

War in Donbas 
The brigade fought in the war in Donbas.

In August 2014 the brigade's units were involved in an attempt to relieve encircled forces near Ilovaisk. A company tactical group was formed which had 276 soldiers, four tanks, three SPGs and more than ten IFVs. It was sent from Chuhuiv towards Ilovaisk on 24 August 2014, after it became clear that Russian military forces were approaching Ilovaisk. The unit was supposed to join up with an assault detachment from the Rukh Oporu Battalion and try to breach the Russian encirclement. The 92nd Brigade's company arrived at the city of Komsomolske on 27 August and advanced towards Ilovaisk. The column stopped in the field for a night and shortly after it was hit by heavy artillery shelling. The next morning it was defeated by Russian paratroopers, losing most vehicles but suffering relatively low personnel casualties: eight killed and several missing.

On 18 September 2014, the brigade received a number of refurbished T-64BV tanks. On 5 April 2015, four soldiers of the brigade were killed when their vehicle was blown up while crossing a bridge in Shchastia. Among those killed was brigade deputy chief of staff Major Oleh Kovbasa. The brigade was stationed in Shchastia as of June 2015.

On 16 May 2015, troops of 92nd Mechanized Brigade captured two Russian soldiers of the 3rd Guards Spetsnaz Brigade during a fight near Shchastia. One Ukrainian soldier was killed in the fight.

On 18 November 2015 the brigade's honorifics "Ropsha Order of the October Revolution Red Banner" were removed as part of an Armed Forces-wide removal of Soviet awards and honorifics.

Colonel Pavlo Fedosenko has commanded the brigade since 6 May 2020 and was awarded the Hero of Ukraine.

2022 Russian Invasion of Ukraine 
In September 2022, the brigade participated in the Kharkiv counteroffensive from Andriivka alongside the 25th Airborne Brigade and 80th Air Assault Brigade towards Kupiansk and capturing the city on September 10. Members of the brigade's 1st Mechanized Battalion were seen holding a Ukrainian battle flag with the Kupiansk City Council building in the background.

By December 30, the brigade along with the Kraken Regiment after months of fighting, retook the village of Novoselivske 18km northwest of Svatove in the Luhansk Oblast with numerous Russian captives.

Current Structure 

As of 2017 the brigade's structure is as follows:

 92nd Mechanized Brigade, Kluhyno-Bashkyrivka
 Headquarters & Headquarters Company
 1st Mechanized Battalion
 2nd Mechanized Battalion
 3rd Mechanized Battalion
 1st Tank Battalion
 22nd Motorized Infantry Battalion "Kharkiv"
 Brigade Artillery Group
 Headquarters & Target Acquisition Battery
 Self-propelled Artillery Battalion (2S3 Akatsiya)
 Self-propelled Artillery Battalion (2S1 Gvozdika)
 Rocket Artillery Battalion (BM-21 Grad)
 Anti-tank Artillery Battalion (MT-12 Rapira)
 Anti-Aircraft Missile Artillery Battalion
 Engineer Battalion
 Maintenance Battalion
 Logistic Battalion
 Reconnaissance Company
 Sniper Company
 Electronic Warfare Company
 Signal Company
 Radar Company
 CBRN-defense Company
 Medical Company

Traditions 
In 2000, the Presidential Decree approved the full official name of the connection: "92 Separate Mechanized Ropshinsky Order of the October Revolution and the Red Banner of the Brigade."

In 2007, the command of the brigade sought before the Supreme Commander that the brigade would be given another name - "Chuguevskaya".

On November 18, 2015, as part of the general military reform, Soviet honorary names were excluded from the name. According to the Decree of the President of Ukraine, the full official name of the connection: "92 separate mechanized brigade".

On August 22, 2019, the President of Ukraine awarded the Brigade an honorary name: "92 Separate mechanized brigade named after Ivan Sirko's Cossack Otaman." 

On May 6, 2022, the brigade was awarded the honorary distinction "For Courage and Bravery".

Sources and references

Mechanised infantry brigades of Ukraine
Military units and formations established in 1920
Military units and formations established in 2000
Military units and formations of Ukraine in the war in Donbas
Military units and formations of the 2022 Russian invasion of Ukraine